Trechoblemus is a genus of beetles in the family Carabidae 

containing the following species:

 Trechoblemus lindrothi Sueasom, 1957
 Trechoblemus microphthalmus Ueno, 1955
 Trechoblemus micros (Herbst, 1784)
 Trechoblemus postilenatus Bates, 1873
 Trechoblemus valentinei Suenson, 1957
 Trechoblemus westcotti Barr, 1972

References